Uvedale Corbett may refer to:
Uvedale Shobdon Corbett DSO (1909–2005), British soldier, politician and businessman
Uvedale Corbett Junior, Poor Law Inspector
Sir Uvedale Corbet (1668–1701), 3rd of the Corbet baronets
 Uvedale Corbett, barrister, son of Archdeacon Joseph Corbett of Longnor, Shropshire and brother of Panton Corbett

See also
Corbett (surname)